Live Inferno is the final release from the band Emperor. It was filmed during the band's sold out 2005-2007 reunion performances. It was released in Europe on 20 April with several editions available. It is available as a 2CD slipcase with 16pg booklet, a limited edition Digibook featuring 2 CDs & DVD with an enhanced 24pg booklet, a single DVD, and two limited edition double vinyl gatefold sets. The audio portion of the "Live Inferno" series features exclusive recordings from the band's headlining performances at Norway's Inferno festival and Germany's Wacken Open Air festival. The video portion, titled "Live at Wacken Open Air 2006 - A Night Of Emperial Wrath", has a running time of 70 minutes and includes footage professionally filmed at the Wacken Open Air festival with additional on-stage and exclusive backstage footage filmed and compiled by the band.

"It looks like these releases will be the final nail in the coffin for Emperor," says guitarist Samoth. "They are a testimony of the live reunion that took Emperor to even new heights; unique events like Wacken where Emperor headlined in front of 60,000 people. We had a great run of shows and feel lucky that we were able to come back even bigger and perform songs from our complete catalogue for a lot of dedicated fans old and new. There will be several cool formats and limited editions coming that should be a nice treat for the fans and a worthy representation of the Emperor legacy. Emperor is dead, long live the Emperor!"

Disc 1 - Inferno Festival (CD)
 Infinity Burning (medley)
 Cosmic Keys to My Creations & Times
 Thus Spake the Nightspirit
 An Elegy of Icaros
 Curse You All Men!
 Wrath of the Tyrant
 With Strength I Burn
 Towards the Pantheon
 The Majesty of the Nightsky
 The Loss and Curse of Reverence
 In the Wordless Chamber
 Inno a Satana
 I am the Black Wizards
 Ye Entrancemperium
 Opus a Satana

Disc 2 - Wacken Open Air (CD)
 Infinity Burning (medley)
 Cosmic Keys to My Creations & Times
 Thus Spake the Nightspirit
 An Elegy of Icaros
 Curse You All Men!
 With Strength I Burn
 Towards the Pantheon
 The Majesty of the Nightsky
 The Loss and Curse of Reverence
 In the Wordless Chamber
 I Am the Black Wizards
 Inno a Satana

Disc 3 - Wacken Open Air 'A Night of Emperial Wrath'(DVD)
 Infinity Burning (medley)
 Cosmic Keys to My Creations & Times
 Thus Spake the Nightspirit
 An Elegy of Icaros
 Curse You All Men!
 With Strength I Burn
 Towards the Pantheon
 The Majesty of the Nightsky
 The Loss and Curse of Reverence
 In the Wordless Chamber
 I Am the Black Wizards
 Inno a Satana
Behind the Scenes
Live Bootleg Videos

Credits
Ihsahn - Guitar and Vocals
Samoth - Guitar
Trym - Drums
Secthdaemon - Bass and Backing Vocals session
Einar - Keyboards and Backing Vocals session

Production
Produced By Thorbjorn Akkerhaugen & Emperor
Both CD's mixed at Akkerhaugen Lydstudio & Symphonique Studios, 2008
Christophe Szpajdel – logo

References

External links
 Live Inferno Releases at Candlelightrecords
 Emperor Official Website

Emperor (band) live albums
2009 live albums
2009 video albums
Live video albums